La bella Ceci y el imprudente, is a Colombian telenovela produced by Caracol Televisión. It stars Julián Román and Manuela González. It premiered on November 23, 2009 and ended on August 26, 2010, a total of 183 chapters. The telenovela continues to be a hit worldwide and has been licensed in 22 countries.

Cast

Awards and nominations

References

External links 
 

Colombian telenovelas
2009 telenovelas
Spanish-language telenovelas
Caracol Televisión telenovelas
2009 Colombian television series debuts
2010 Colombian television series endings
Television shows set in Colombia